Lenk, officially Lenk im Simmental, is a municipality in the district of Obersimmental in the canton of Bern in Switzerland

Lenk may also refer to:

People:

 Arthur Lenk, an Israeli diplomat
 Maria Lenk, a Brazilian swimmer
 Tom Lenk, an American stage and television actor 

Other uses:

 Maria Lenk National Aquatic Center, in Rio de Janeiro, Brazil